Florian Mistelbauer (born 20 November 1983 in Vienna) is an Austrian figure skater who competed in men's singles. He is the 2003 Merano Cup silver medalist and a three-time Austrian national bronze medalist (1999, 2002, and 2003).

References

External links
 

Austrian male single skaters
1983 births
Living people
Figure skaters from Vienna
Competitors at the 2003 Winter Universiade